Ciara Quinn Bravo (born March 18, 1997) is an American actress. She began her career as a child actress, starring in the Nickelodeon series Big Time Rush and the Fox series Red Band Society. She also appeared in the Nickelodeon television films Jinxed and Swindle.

Bravo's voice work includes Giselita in Open Season 3, Patty in Happiness Is a Warm Blanket, Charlie Brown, and Sarah in Special Agent Oso.

Early life
Born and raised in Alexandria, Kentucky, Bravo attended Summit Country Day School nearby in Cincinnati, Ohio.

Career
Bravo's career began at the age of nine after attending the Model and Talent Expo Presented by Mike Beaty in Dallas, Texas. She was discovered by Bryan Leder and Frederick Levy of Management 101. This led to several voice-overs for Playhouse Disney and Can You Teach My Alligator Manners?, an appearance in the Willow Smith music video "Knees and Elbows", and several commercials.

During 2008, she continued pursuing auditions and acted in several local commercials for Newport Aquarium and made a short appearance as an Italian girl in the hit film Angels & Demons.

Bravo acted in two short films, Lost Sheep (or The Cafeteria) and Washed Up; and in the Nickelodeon television series, Big Time Rush and the Fox television series, Red Band Society. Bravo is also a voice actress; she has provided the voice of Giselita in the Open Season franchise. She has also done voice work in Happiness Is a Warm Blanket, Charlie Brown, Special Agent Oso, and The Penguins of Madagascar.

Bravo has also appeared in the film To the Bone, which draws attention to anorexia.

Filmography

Film

Television

References

External links

 
 Katalyst article

1997 births
Living people
Actresses from Kentucky
American child actresses
American film actresses
American television actresses
American voice actresses
People from Campbell County, Kentucky
21st-century American actresses